Neighbor Singing is the debut solo album of composer Brad Laner, released on November 6, 2007 through Hometapes. Although the Electric Company and Amnesia albums were primarily composed and performed by Laner, Neighbor Singing is the first album to be issued under his own name.

Track listing

Personnel 
Musicians
Brad Laner – vocals, instruments, engineering
Julian Laner – synthesizer on "Lovely World"
Aracelis Yera – backing vocals on "Out Cold"
Production and additional personnel
J.J. Golden – mastering
Josh Keyes – painting
Thom Monahan – production, mixing

References

External links 
 

2007 albums
Albums produced by Thom Monahan
Brad Laner albums